Pseudorontium is a genus of flowering plants with one species, Pseudorontium cyathiferum (syn. Antirrhinum cyathiferum), a New World snapdragon known by the common names dog's-mouth and Deep Canyon snapdragon. It is native to the deserts of northern Mexico and adjacent California and Arizona. It is an annual herb producing a hairy, erect, non-climbing stem with many oval-shaped leaves. The solitary flowers are dark-veined deep purple and white, often with some yellow in the throat, and are about a centimeter long. Previously considered to belong among the New World Antirrhinum species, it is now considered the sole member of the related genus Pseudorontium.

References

External links
The Plant List
Jepson Manual Treatment
Photo gallery

Plantaginaceae genera
Monotypic Lamiales genera
Plantaginaceae